Tudoran is a family name common in Romania.
Dorin Tudoran, poet, journalist
Ioana Tudoran, canoer
Lavinia Tudoran, journalist
Radu Tudoran, novelist
Ana Alina Tudoran, professor

Romanian-language surnames